Siddhivinayak temple may refer to the following Hindu Ganesha temples:

 Siddhivinayak Temple, Siddhatek, Ashtavinayak temple
 Siddhivinayak Temple, Mumbai
 Siddhivinayak Mahaganapati Temple, Titwala, Thane district